The following is an incomplete list of films set or shot primarily in Delft, The Netherlands.

 De Lucha Boys (2010)
 Girl with a Pearl Earring (film) (2003)
 Nosferatu the Vampyre (1979)

References

External links 
 https://www.imdb.com/search/title?locations=Delft,%20Zuid-Holland,%20Netherlands

Delft